Harrietsham railway station serves Harrietsham in Kent, England.

The station, and all trains serving it, are operated by Southeastern.

History
The goods yard was on the up side. It comprised three sidings, one of which served a goods shed. Freight facilities were withdrawn on 1 May 1961. The signal box closed on 5 November 1972.

The ticket office is staffed only during the morning peak period; at other times a PERTIS 'permit to travel' machine, located at the entrance to the up platform, suffices.

Services
All services at Harrietsham are operated by Southeastern using  and  EMUs.

The typical off-peak service in trains per hour is:
 1 tph to  via  
 1 tph to 

During the peak hours, the station is served by an additional hourly service between London Victoria and Ashford International, increasing the service to 2 tph in each direction.

References 

Sources

External links

Borough of Maidstone
Railway stations in Kent
DfT Category E stations
Former London, Chatham and Dover Railway stations
Railway stations in Great Britain opened in 1884
Railway stations served by Southeastern
1884 establishments in England